Kyle McCarley (born December 5) is an American voice actor known for his work in video games and anime. In anime, he is known as the voice of Shigeo Kageyama from Mob Psycho 100, Mikazuki Augus from Mobile Suit Gundam: Iron-Blooded Orphans, Shinji Mato from Fate/stay night: Unlimited Blade Works and Fate/stay night: Heaven's Feel, Ryota Watari from Your Lie in April, Killy from Blame, Narancia Ghirga from JoJo's Bizarre Adventure: Vento Aureo, Joe Shimamura from Cyborg 009: Call of Justice and Helbram from The Seven Deadly Sins. In video games, he is known for his performances as lead characters 9S from Nier: Automata, Zeroken from Disgaea 5, Alm in Fire Emblem Echoes: Shadows of Valentia, Gatekeeper in Fire Emblem: Three Houses, Harry Potter in Harry Potter: Wizards Unite and the comedic role of Doi in Hi Score Girl and as his role as Wizard Cookie in Cookie Run: Kingdom.

Personal life 
McCarley is married to Katelyn Gault, who is a voice actress that made her debut in Little Witch Academia.

Crunchyroll controversy 
In September 2022, McCarley's contract to voice Shigeo Kageyama, the protagonist of Mob Psycho 100, was not renewed by Crunchyroll. McCarley, who is a member of SAG-AFTRA, had offered to work on a non-union contract for the third season, on the condition that Crunchyroll meet with SAG-AFTRA representatives to discuss potential future contracts. Crunchyroll refused the offer, sparking criticism from anime fans and media outlets. Despite the controversy, Crunchyroll continued with their simulcast strategy of releasing Mob Psycho 100 III dubbed episodes on the same day as the subtitled release with little marketing or advanced notice beforehand. Mob's new voice actor, McCarley's replacement, has remained uncredited thus far.

Filmography

Animation

Video games

Anime

Film

Live action

Video games

References

External links 
 
 
 
 
 

Living people
21st-century American male actors
American male video game actors
American male voice actors
Twitch (service) streamers
University of Southern California alumni
Year of birth missing (living people)